Quinton Crocker (born 26 June 1987) is a South African rugby union player, currently playing with KwaZulu-Natal club side College Rovers. He is a utility back that can play at centre, full-back, fly-half or winger.

Career

He came through the Sharks Academy, representing their youth teams between 2005 and 2008. He failed to break through to the first team, however.

He was part of the  squad for the 2011 Varsity Cup competition and then joined  for the same competition in Varsity Cup, scoring 20 points.

He then joined the  before the 2012 Currie Cup First Division, where he made his first class debut against near-neighbours .

He joined Sri Lankan Dialog Rugby League side Kandy in 2014, but returned to South Africa in 2015 to join College Rovers prior to their SARU Community Cup campaign.

References

South African rugby union players
Living people
1987 births
People from Kempton Park, Gauteng
Border Bulldogs players
Rugby union players from Gauteng
Rugby union fly-halves